The Manpupuner rock formations (Man-Pupu-Nyor; Mansi:  , literally ’Small Idol Mountain’; Komi:  , literally ’Idol Stone’) are a set of 7 stone pillars located west of the Ural mountains in the Troitsko-Pechorsky District of the Komi Republic. They are located on the territory of the Pechoro-Ilychski Reserve on the mountain Man-Pupu-nyor, between the Ilych and Pechora rivers. They are also known as the Seven Strong Men Rock Formations and the Poles of the Komi Republic. 
Deemed one of the Seven Wonders of Russia, the Manpupuner rock formations are a popular attraction in Russia, though relatively unspoiled by tourism.

Description

The height of the rocks varies between 30 and 42 metres. About 200 million years ago at the location of the stone pillars, there were high mountains. Rain, snow, wind, frost and heat gradually eroded the mountains. Solid sericite-quartzite schists, from which the remains are composed, were eroded less and survive today. Soft rocks were destroyed by weathering and carried by water and wind into depressions.

One pillar, 34 meters high, stands somewhat apart from the others. It resembles an inverted bottle. Six others lie at the edge of the cliff. The pillars are said to resemble the figures of a huge man or the head of a horse or ram. There are numerous legends associated with Manpupuner. The formations were once considered sacred by the local Mansi people and climbing them was regarded as a sin.

Fauna
In the vicinity of the plateau, there are viviparous lizards, squirrels, martens, sables, otters, stoats, American minks, brown bears, wolverines, and foxes.

Tourism

The formations can be accessed by road from the Komi Republic, hiking or skiing over the Dyatlov Pass from the Sverdlovsk region, or helicopter. Until 2004, a car route from the Sverdlovsk Region was allowed, with a visit to the Dyatlov Pass, the Otorten Mountain and the source of the Pechora River. It was officially banned by 2 protected areas along which the route lies - the Pechoro-Ilychsky Reserve and the Ivdelsky Reserve.

See also
 Butte

References

External links

Official images of the Manpupuner rocks
В гости к семерым великанам (Izvestia, 9 avril 2009)
 Столбы выветривания на плато Мань-Пупу-нёр (7 чудес России)
 Manpupuner. Seven Wonders of Russia. Seven Wonders of Komi.

Rock formations of Russia
Landforms of the Komi Republic
Tourist attractions in the Komi Republic